Edward John Gagliardi (February 13, 1952 – May 11, 2014) was an American bass guitarist, best known as the original bass player for the 1970s rock band Foreigner. He was a member of Foreigner from the beginning in 1976. Gagliardi, most notably, played a Fireglo Rickenbacker bass guitar, left-handed even though he was naturally right-handed. It is widely known that he did so out of admiration, and devotion to Paul McCartney (most often self-doctored from right-handed basses, reengineered and played upside down, by Gagliardi himself). Gagliardi was on the albums Foreigner and Double Vision, but was fired from the band in 1979.

In 1981, Gagliardi formed the band Spys with former Foreigner keyboardist Al Greenwood, a band that set the tone for much of the 80's synth-rock bands, and received acclaim within the musical community.

In the early 2000s, Gagliardi worked as a Service Department Writer at Rallye Lexus in Glen Cove, New York.

Gagliardi died of cancer on May 11, 2014, after battling it for eight years. Friends and family held a private ceremony.

References

1952 births
2014 deaths
American rock bass guitarists
American male bass guitarists
Foreigner (band) members
Guitarists from New York City
American male guitarists
20th-century American guitarists
Deaths from cancer in New York (state)